Kagate or Kagatay may refer to:

 Kagate people, a Tibetan people of Nepal
 Kagate language, their language

See also 

 Kyirong-Kagate language
 Çağatay